Bolgoda Lake or Bolgoda River is a freshwater lake in the Western Province of Sri Lanka, straddling the border between Colombo District and Kalutara District. It consists of two main bodies of water, a Northern portion and a Southern portion, connected by a waterway called Bolgoda River. The lake drains into the sea at the estuary in Panadura.

Bolgoda Lake is part of Bolgoda Environmental Protection Area, gazetted in December 2009 and consisting of 5 subdivisions:

 Bolgoda Ganga
 Bolgoda North Lake
 Bolgoda South Lake
 Panadura Ganga
 Weras Ganga

The lake is a popular location for watersports with the Ceylon Motor Yacht Club been located on the shores of the lake since 1936. The waterfront properties around the lake are owned by wealthy and notable individuals such as Mangala Samaraweera and Susanthika Jayasinghe.

Lake environment 

Illegal constructions near the lake are a major emerging issue, with the Sri Lankan government claiming that 90% of constructions have not obtained the required environmental approval. Pollution and irregular disposal of garbage are some other concerns facing the lake and its surroundings. The Sri Lanka Navy and the Police are involved in efforts to protect the wetlands.

Gallery

References 

Bodies of water of Colombo District
Bodies of water of Kalutara District
Lakes of Sri Lanka
Reservoirs in Sri Lanka
Wetlands of Sri Lanka